Anadağ is a village in Derecik District in Hakkâri Province in Turkey. The village is populated by Kurds of the Gerdî tribe and had a population of 4,251 in 2021. Anadağ has the five hamlets of Bağlıca, Beşikağaç, Bölek, Gökçetaş and Yeşilova, attached to it. Three of these hamlets are unpopulated.

History 
It was attached to Şemdinli District before becoming part of the newly-created Derecik District in 2018.

On 24 August 2015, an Mw 39 earthquake centered in the village struck the area.

Population 
Population history of the village from 2007 to 2022:

References 

Villages in Derecik District
Kurdish settlements in Hakkâri Province